Willamy Freire (born July 28, 1987) is a Brazilian professional mixed martial artist who has fought for Shooto and the Ultimate Fighting Championship. Freire was also the Shooto Welterweight Champion.

Mixed martial arts career

Early career
Freire compiled a 12–2 record prior to signing with Shooto. This included a 1–1 record against Jose Luis Nogueira and a 4-fight grand prix tournament victory held over the course of one night.

Shooto
Freire was scheduled to face Peter Angerer for the SHIDO MMA Welterweight Championship in May 2007. However, just prior to the fight, he was knocked unconscious in training and suffered a deep cut, so he had to withdraw. In July 2007, Freire made his Shooto debut against Hacran Dias, his future Nova Uniao team-mate. Freire lost via unanimous decision. This was his final defeat before an 11 fight win streak, prior to joining the UFC.

After the Shooto Welterweight Championship was vacated, Freire faced Kenichiro Togashi for the title. After 2:05 of the first round, Freire was declared the winner via TKO (doctor stoppage), gaining him the title.

After a non-title fight against Mikael Lähdesmäki, which Freire won via unanimous decision, Freire faced Yusuke Endo for the second time in his first title defence. Freire was declared the winner via split decision (29–28, 28–29, 29–27) and immediately vacated the title, as he had already signed with the UFC.

Ultimate Fighting Championship
Freire signed with the Ultimate Fighting Championship which was announced in June 2010. He was scheduled to make his debut against Thiago Tavares at UFC Live: Jones vs. Matyushenko in August, but would later withdraw with injury.  Since Tavares was left without an opponent, he too was pulled from the event.

In November 2010, Freire was cleared to compete after recovering from his knee injury. Freire faced Waylon Lowe in his UFC debut on January 22, 2011 at UFC Fight Night 23.  He lost the fight via unanimous decision and will be out indefinitely after injuring his right hand and right cheekbone.

Freire was released from the UFC following this loss.

DREAM
Freire was expected to face Shinya Aoki on May 29, 2011 at DREAM Fight for Japan!. The fight was called off due to visa issues. Freire was set to fight Tatsuya Kawajiri on July 16, 2011 at Dream.17 but a hand injury forced him off the card.

Freire ultimately made his DREAM debut at Dream 17 against Satoru Kitaoka.  He lost the fight via split decision.

Championships and accomplishments
Shooto
Shooto Welterweight (154 lbs.) Championship (One time)

Mixed martial arts record

|-
| Win
| align=center| 26–6
| Paulo Dantas
| DQ (faked knee to groin)
| Brazilian King Fighter 3
| 
| align=center| 1
| align=center| N/A
| Fortaleza, Brazil
| 
|-
| Loss
| align=center| 25–6
| Joao Luiz Nogueira
| TKO (punches)
| OX MMA
| 
| align=center| 2
| align=center| 0:27
| Fortaleza, Brazil
| 
|-
| Win
| align=center| 25–5
| Zozimar de Oliveira Silva Jr.
| Submission (guillotine choke)
| Brazilian King Fighter
| 
| align=center| 2
| align=center| 1:45
| Fortaleza, Brazil
| 
|-
| Loss
| align=center| 24–5
| Satoru Kitaoka
| Decision (split)
| Dream 17
| 
| align=center| 3
| align=center| 5:00
| Saitama, Saitama, Japan
| 
|-
| Loss
| align=center| 24–4
| Waylon Lowe
| Decision (unanimous)
| UFC: Fight For The Troops 2
| 
| align=center| 3
| align=center| 5:00
| Fort Hood, Texas, United States
| 
|-
| Win
| align=center| 24–3
| Yusuke Endo
| Decision (split)
| Shooto: The Way of Shooto 3: Like a Tiger, Like a Dragon
| 
| align=center| 3
| align=center| 5:00
| Tokyo, Japan
| Defended Shooto Welterweight (154 lbs.) Championship; Later vacated title.
|-
| Win
| align=center| 23–3
| Mikael Lähdesmäki
| Decision (unanimous)
| Shooto - Brazil 15
| 
| align=center| 3
| align=center| 5:00
| Rio de Janeiro, Brazil
| 
|-
| Win
| align=center| 22–3
| Kenichiro Togashi
| TKO (doctor stoppage)
| Vale Tudo Japan 2009
| 
| align=center| 1
| align=center| 2:05
| Tokyo, Japan
| Won Shooto Welterweight (154 lbs.) Championship
|-
| Win
| align=center| 21–3
| Vincent Latoel
| Submission (guillotine choke)
| Shooto - The Way of Shooto 3
| 
| align=center| 2
| align=center| 2:59
| Fortaleza, Brazil
| 
|-
| Win
| align=center| 20–3
| Yusuke Endo
| Submission (guillotine choke)
| Shooto: Shooto Tradition Final
| 
| align=center| 1
| align=center| 5:00
| Tokyo, Japan
| 
|-
| Win
| align=center| 19–3
| Randy Steinke
| Submission (D'arce choke)
| Shooto - Brazil 9
| 
| align=center| 1
| align=center| 3:18
| Fortaleza, Brazil
| 
|-
| Win
| align=center| 18–3
| Mateus Machado
| Submission (guillotine choke)
| Shooto - Brazil 8
| 
| align=center| 1
| align=center| 1:25
| Rio de Janeiro, Brazil
| 
|-
| Win
| align=center| 17–3
| Giovani Diniz
| KO (punch)
| Shooto - Brazil 6
| 
| align=center| 2
| align=center| 4:50
| Rio de Janeiro, Brazil
| 
|-
| Win
| align=center| 16–3
| Ari Craupina 
| Submission (arm triangle choke)
| Kabra Fight Nordeste
| 
| align=center| 1
| align=center| N/A
| Fortaleza, Brazil
| 
|-
| Win
| align=center| 15–3
| Claudiere Freitas
| Decision (unanimous)
| Shooto - Brazil 5
| 
| align=center| 3
| align=center| 5:00
| Rio de Janeiro, Brazil
| 
|-
| Win
| align=center| 14–3
| Daniel Silveira
| TKO (punches)
| MZI - Combat 2
| 
| align=center| 1
| align=center| N/A
| Caico, Brazil
| 
|-
| Win
| align=center| 13–3
| Patricky Freire
| Technical Decision (majority)
| Rino's FC 4
| 
| align=center| 3
| align=center| 1:45
| Fortaleza, Brazil
| 
|-
| Loss
| align=center| 12–3
| Hacran Dias
| Decision (unanimous)
| Shooto - Brazil 3
| 
| align=center| 3
| align=center| 5:00
| Rio de Janeiro, Brazil
| 
|-
| Win
| align=center| 12–2
| Paulo Dantas
| Submission (rear naked choke)
| Ceara Vale Tudo Meeting
| 
| align=center| 3
| align=center| 2:44
| Fortaleza, Brazil
| 
|-
| Win
| align=center| 11–2
| Gasparzinho 
| TKO (retirement) 
| Rino's FC 3
| 
| align=center| N/A
| align=center| N/A
| Recife, Brazil
| 
|-
| Win
| align=center| 10–2
| Rafael Bastos
| Submission (north-south choke)
| Predador FC 4 - Kamae
| 
| align=center| 1
| align=center| N/A
| Fortaleza, Brazil
| 
|-
| Win
| align=center| 9–2
| Phillip Schade
| Decision (unanimous)
| UCS - Fighting Day 3
| 
| align=center| 3
| align=center| 5:00
| Geislingen, Germany
| 
|-
| Loss
| align=center| 8–2
| Joao Luiz Nogueira
| Submission (guillotine choke)
| Tridenium Combat
| 
| align=center| 1
| align=center| 4:50
| Fortaleza, Brazil
| 
|-
| Win
| align=center| 8–1
| Joao Luiz Nogueira
| Decision (unanimous)
| Bad Boy Championship
| 
| align=center| 3
| align=center| 5:00
| Fortaleza, Brazil
| 
|-
| Win
| align=center| 7–1
| Erivan Silva 
| Submission (punches) 
| MZIF - MZI Fight 
| 
| align=center| 2 
| align=center| 2:58 
| Rio Grande do Norte, Brazil
| 
|-
| Loss
| align=center| 6–1
| Helman PQD
| Submission (rear naked choke)
| MF - Mossoro Fight
| 
| align=center| 3
| align=center| 2:25
| Mossoro, Brazil
| 
|-
| Win
| align=center| 6–0
| Carlos Heide 	
| TKO (punches) 
| COVT - Ceara Open Vale Tudo 2 
| 
| align=center| 3
| align=center| 5:00
| Fortaleza, Brazil
| 
|-
| Win
| align=center| 5–0
| David Oliveira
| TKO (punches)
| Champions Fight
| 
| align=center| 2
| align=center| N/A
| Paraiba, Brazil
| 
|-
| Win
| align=center| 4–0
| Cesar da Costa Alencar
| Decision (split)
| Quixada Open Vale Tudo - Grand Prix
| 
| align=center| 2
| align=center| 5:00
| Quixada, Ceara, Brazil
| 
|-
| Win
| align=center| 3–0
| Glauber do Santos Silveira
| TKO (doctor stoppage)
| Quixada Open Vale Tudo - Grand Prix
| 
| align=center| 2
| align=center| N/A
| Quixada, Ceara, Brazil
| 
|-
| Win
| align=center| 2–0
| Francisco Diego
| TKO (knee and punches)
| Quixada Open Vale Tudo - Grand Prix
| 
| align=center| 1
| align=center| N/A
| Quixada, Ceara, Brazil
| 
|-
| Win
| align=center| 1–0
| Gesias Cavalcante Crispim
| Submission (rear naked choke)
| Quixada Open Vale Tudo - Grand Prix
| 
| align=center| 3
| align=center| N/A
| Quixada, Ceara, Brazil
|

References

External links

1987 births
Living people
Brazilian male mixed martial artists
Lightweight mixed martial artists
Mixed martial artists utilizing Brazilian jiu-jitsu
Sportspeople from Fortaleza
Brazilian practitioners of Brazilian jiu-jitsu
People awarded a black belt in Brazilian jiu-jitsu
Ultimate Fighting Championship male fighters